The Association of BellTel Retirees, Inc. advocates for more than 205,000 Bell Atlantic, NYNEX, GTE, MCI, Idearc Media|Idearc/SuperMedia, and Verizon union and management retirees. The association also represents active Verizon employees regarding retiree issues, such as cash balance plan conversions and termination of management pension and healthcare benefits.

Corporations have been cutting back on retiree pensions and healthcare coverage. The Association’s advocacy works to prevent widespread cuts for Verizon and SuperMedia retirees.  

The 134,000 members of the Association of BellTel Retirees have banded together to fight for the protection of retirees.  The association believes that with all retirees acting together they can achieve pension inflation protection and, through congressional action, restore and protect the healthcare benefits that have been chiseled away through passage of federal retiree healthcare protection legislation.			

In a class federal action lawsuit, participants in Verizon’s (VZ) pension plans who were involuntarily transferred to Idearc’s pension plans in November 2006 have pending claims of ERISA violations including:
 Breach of fiduciary duty for failure to comply with pension plan document rules; and
 Other ERISA violations justifying that the federal court order declaratory, injunctive and other equitable relief, and restore the retirees into Verizon’s sponsored employee benefit plans.

The Association of BellTel Retirees can be found on Facebook.

Proxy campaign success wins elimination of Verizon executive golden parachutes and bloated executive bonuses in 2003, 2004, 2005 and 2007. The 2003 win was the first time any Bell System Company was ever defeated in a proxy vote in its 125-year history. The association won the Say on Pay proxy by a 50.18% vote in 2007.

ProtectSeniors.org
ProtectSeniors.Org is a Washington, D.C.-based lobbying group founded in 2006 to advocate for retired Americans. It was founded by Verizon retiree members of the Association of BellTel Retirees.

ProtectSeniors.Org is dedicated to the interests of corporate retirees in the United States. The group represents 14.3 million retirees from 392 companies, 45 labor union locals, 98 municipal, state and federal retiree groups and 16 associations.

References
 Fortune Magazine - We Won't Be Ignored - August 13, 2001
Business Week -Revenge of the Retirees - November 18, 2002 
Fortune Magazine – A Big Win For the Little Guys for Shareholder Activists 2003 Shaping Up to Be a Very Good Year – June 16, 2003
USA Today - Pension Funds Fall Short of Guarantees - January 16, 2006
 Pittsburgh Tribune – Review - Verizon Retirees Seek Say on Pay - May 3, 2007
New York Times - Verizon Vote On Pay Levels To Be Decided In a Recount –May 4, 2007 
New York Times – Say On Pay Gets Support at Verizon – May 19, 2007
 *New York Times – Verizon to Put Executive Pay to Shareholder Vote – November 2, 2007
 Reuters - Verizon Retirees to Shareowners: Vote Nay on Pay- April 9, 2009
Philadelphia Inquirer - Verizon Retirees Group Continues to Advocate for Change - April 22, 2009
 Huffington Post - Retirees Group To Vote Against Verizon CEO’s Pay – March 31, 2009
Verizon Shareholders Approve Executive pay – May 7, 2009
Dallas Business Journal - Idearc Inc., Verizon Communications Inc. sued by retirees - January 4, 2010
Crain's New York Business - Putting Verizon CEO's Pay Through The Wringer - March 28, 2010 (subscription required)
Crain's New York Business - Facing the Music on Boss Pay - June 20, 2010 
Bergen Record - Retirees Seek To Limit Verizon Executive Bonuses -March 31, 2011
 Star Ledger -Retirees Seek To Limi Verizon Executive Bonuses - March 31, 2011 
Bloomberg News - Verizon Retiree Group Proposes Performance Share Payout Limits- March 29, 2011
Long Island Business News - Verizon retirees sue to protect their pensions - June 17, 2011
Times Ledger - Doug retiree battles on to keep BellTel benefits - June 22, 2011
Syosset Jericho Tribune - Fighting for Retiree Benefits for 15 Years - September 2, 2011
The Ocean Star - Resident works with retiree group to protect pensions - October 7, 2011
Queens Tribune - Retirees Celebrate 15 Years of Fight - October 20, 2011
Star Democrat - Easton resident continues fight for retiree benefits - December 1, 2011
Courier News and Home News Tribune - N.J. must protect benefits of those already retired - December 6, 2011
Daily Record - N.J. must protect benefits of those already retired - December 6, 2011

External links
Official website

Retirement in the United States